is a former Japanese football player.

Playing career
Suzuki was born in Yokosuka on November 26, 1977. After graduating from Kokushikan University, he joined J1 League club Avispa Fukuoka in 2000. However he could hardly play in the match. In 2001, he moved to J2 League club Sagan Tosu. He played many matches as midfielder from 2001 and became a regular player right midfielder and right side back in 2003. However he could hardly play in the match in 2004. In July 2004, he moved to Regional Leagues club Volca Kagoshima. In 2005, he moved to Regional Leagues club Rosso Kumamoto. He played many matches and the club was promoted to Japan Football League. He retired end of 2006 season.

Club statistics

References

External links

1977 births
Living people
Kokushikan University alumni
Association football people from Kanagawa Prefecture
Japanese footballers
J1 League players
J2 League players
Japan Football League players
Avispa Fukuoka players
Sagan Tosu players
Roasso Kumamoto players
Association football midfielders